Asonaba Kwaku Darko (12 January 1935 – 13 February 2018) popularly known as Super OD was a Ghanaian comic actor and a performer who featured in the popular Akan drama TV series, Osofo Dadzie and movies like 'Diabolo' .

Career
He started his acting career in the early 1970s and became a household name in the early 1990s in the television series Akan Drama on GTV. He was with the S. K. Oppong Drama Group which later became known as Osofo Dadzie Group. Some of his co-stars in the group include Nathaniel Frimpong Manso (Osofo Dadzie), Samuel Kwesi Oppong (SK Oppong), Kwadwo Kwakye, Fred Addai, Kingsley Kofi Kyeremanteng (Ajos), Mercy Offei, Bea Kissi, Jane Ackon (Mama Jane), Akua Boahemaa, Helena Maame Adjoa Pieterson (Adjoa Pee), Louisa Debra (Mama Lee) among others.

Filmography 
List of films acted over the period.
 Obra
 Osofo Dadzie
 Diabolo
 Bongo Bar
 Double Cross
 Fatal Decision
 Crossfire
 Expectations

References

1934 births
2018 deaths
Ghanaian actors